Gerald Clark (born November 29, 1952) is a Republican politician. Clark represented District 29C of the Maryland House of Delegates from when he was appointed to the position on October 13, 2016, to January 11, 2023.

Early life and career
Clark was born in Maryland on November 29, 1952 and attended Central High School in Seat Pleasant, Maryland. He is a small business owner, having operated the Port of Call Wine and Spirits in Solomons, Maryland since 1979.

From 2002 to 2014, Clark served on the Calvert County Board of Commissioners. Since 2016, he has been a member of the Tri-County Council for Southern Maryland.

In 2014, Port of Call Liquors was cited for violations of the law prohibiting the sale of alcohol to minors. The Calvert County Liquor Board imposed Clark's business with a five day suspension, 30 days of abeyance, and a $1,000 fine.

In September 2016, Governor Larry Hogan appointed Clark to the Maryland House of Delegates, filling a seat left by former Delegate Tony O'Donnell, who had been appointed by Hogan to serve on the Maryland Public Service Commission.

In the legislature
Clark was sworn into the Maryland House of Delegates on October 13, 2016.

Clark filed to run in the 2018 election. He was unopposed in the Republican primary, but faced Democratic candidate Julia Nichols in the general election. During the election, Clark endorsed Jack Bailey in his race for Maryland State Senate District 29. He won with 57% of the vote.

In January 2022, Clark announced that he would not seek re-election in the 2022 Maryland House of Delegates election.

Committee assignments
  Environment and Transportation Committee, 2017–present (local government & bi-county issues subcommittee, 2017–2018; natural resources, agriculture & open space subcommittee, 2017–present; land use & ethics subcommittee, 2019–present)

Electoral history

References

Living people
1952 births
Republican Party members of the Maryland House of Delegates
21st-century American politicians